Bartholomew of Krk was a Croatian nobleman, a member of the Frankopan family, who received the hereditary title of Count of Modruš from King Béla III in 1193. This is the earliest certain example of an office being granted as a hereditary dignity by a Hungarian king.

References

Sources 

 
 

Frankopan family
Modruš-Rijeka County
12th-century Croatian people